Phyllocnistis labyrinthella is a moth of the family Gracillariidae. It is found in most of continental Europe, except Italy, the Mediterranean Islands and parts of the Balkan Peninsula.

The wingspan is 6–7 mm.

The larvae mine the leaves of Populus alba and Populus tremula. The mine consists of a very long, broad epidermal corridor that winds in dense loops over the upperside (and often also the underside) of the leaf without ever intersecting intself. The frass is deposited in a continuous brownish-black central line. The corridor ends at the leaf margin, where it widens somewhat while the leaf margin folds over.

External links
Lepiforum.de

Phyllocnistis
Moths of Europe